Ringtone is a 2010 Indian Malayalam-language film directed by Ajmal, starring Suresh Gopi, Bala and debutant Meghna Nair. This was the last movie of the actor Rajan P. Dev.

Plot
Krishna (Bala) is running from the police for attacking them in public in an attempt to save his mother who was lathi charged. He was travelling in a truck and he meets Meera (Meghna Nair). The truck meets with an accident and they stay as a guest of the truck owner (Rajan P. Dev). Ninan Koshy IPS (Suresh Gopi),an officer from the Central Anti - Terrorist Squad is asked to investigate on this case which has some important links regarding an upcoming maoist insurgency .

Cast
 Suresh Gopi as DIG Ninan Koshy IPS, Central ATS officer
 Bala as Krishna
 Meghna Nair as Meera Bhat
 Rajan P. Dev as Rajasingam Thampuran
 Kiran Raj as Military Commando, ATS officer
 Sai Kumar as Krishna Bhat maoist leader (the main villain)
 Tini Tom as ATS officer
 Abu Salim as Gopi, Lorry Driver
 Bijukuttan
 Zeenath as Krishna's mother
 Kalaranjini as Rajasingam's wife
 Anoop Chandran
 Manuraj
 KPAC Saji as DIG  Jayasimhan IPS, Commissioner of Police
 Baburaj (actor) as CI

References

External links

Nowrunning.com
Indiaglitz.com
Cinefundas.com
Movies.rediff.com
Popcorn.oneindia.in
Thatsmalayalam.oneindia.in

2010 films
2010s Malayalam-language films